Thor DM-18 Agena or just Thor-Agena was a series of orbital launch vehicles. The launch vehicles used the Douglas-built Thor first stage and the Lockheed-built Agena second stages. They are thus cousins of the more-famous Thor-Delta, which founded the Delta launch vehicle family. The first attempted launch of a Thor-Agena was on 28 February 1959. The first successful launch was on 13 April 1959, launching Discoverer 2. It was the first two-stage rocket to place a satellite into orbit.

Launch statistics

Launch history

References 

Lists of Thor and Delta launches
Lists of Thor launches
Lists of rocket launches